Jake Alexander Hesketh (born 27 March 1996) is an English professional footballer who plays as an attacking midfielder for National League club Eastleigh.

Early and personal life
Hesketh was born in Stockport, Greater Manchester, but his family moved to Whiteley, near Fareham, Hampshire when he was six months old. He studied at Whiteley Primary School before moving onto Swanmore College.

Club career

Southampton
Hesketh started his career at Southampton's academy, first training with the club as an under-7 before signing with the club as an under-nine, the youngest at which he could sign, having previously been scouted at a local tournament playing for Crofton Saints Football Club. After progressing through the club's academy, he completed a two-year scholarship with the club and after finishing as the Under-18 team's top scorer was awarded the 2013–14 Scholar of the Season accolade at the Southampton club awards ceremony. He signed a three-year professional contract the same day, having spent the previous six weeks training and playing with the club's under-21 team.

He was promoted into the first team by coach Ronald Koeman due to injury problems among the squad. He made his debut for the club on 8 December 2014 in a Premier League match against Manchester United, being brought in as a substitute for Dušan Tadić in the 70th minute of the 2–1 home defeat. Five days later Hesketh made his first Premier League start as Southampton lost 1–0 away to Burnley. Hesketh made 22 appearances for Martin Hunter's Under-21s in 2014–15, scoring two goals and lifting the 2015 U21 Premier League Cup. He failed to make a first team appearance during the 2015–16 season as he was not part of Koeman's first-team plans, but returned to the first-team following the arrival of Claude Puel as manager in summer 2016. After an appearance for the Southampton under-23 team in the EFL Trophy in August 2016, he made his first first-team appearance of the season and scored his first senior goal on 22 September 2016, in a 2–0 win over Crystal Palace in the EFL Cup. Hesketh played again in a 0–0 UEFA Europa League draw away to Hapoel Beer Sheva a week later, but picked up an injury in October and failed to make any more appearances that season. In December 2016, he signed a new four-and-a-half year contract with the club. Puel was sacked as manager in summer 2017, with Southampton being managed by Mauricio Pellegrino and later Mark Hughes, and Hesketh failed to make a first-team appearance during the 2017–18 season.

Loan spells
On 30 August 2018, Hesketh signed for Burton Albion on a loan deal until 2 January 2019. He scored his first league goal in a 2–2 draw at Portsmouth on 23 October 2018. He appeared 23 times for Burton, scoring three goals. On 31 January 2019, Hesketh joined League Two club Milton Keynes Dons on loan for the remainder of the 2018–19 season. He made his debut for the club as a substitute in a 3–1 defeat to Exeter City on 2 February 2019, before scoring his first goal for the club on 9 February in a 3–2 defeat to Swindon Town. He amassed 16 appearances in total across his loan spell, and scored twice.

On 2 September 2019, he joined League One club Lincoln City on loan for the remainder of the 2019–20 season. He appeared in 24 matches and scored one goal across the 2019–20 season.

He joined League Two club Crawley Town on a season-long loan on 16 October 2020. He made his debut for the club on 20 October 2020 as a substitute in a 2–1 defeat to Exeter City in League Two. On 31 October 2020, Hesketh was given a red card in Crawley’s 2–1 win over Cambridge United.

After 17 years at Southampton, Hesketh announced that he would leave the club at the end of the 2020–21 season after the expiry of his contract.

Eastleigh
Following his release by Southampton in June 2021, Hesketh signed for Eastleigh on 2 August.

Style of play
Hesketh's preferred position is as an attacking midfielder, but is also able to play as a central midfielder or as a wide midfielder.

Career statistics

Honours

Club
Southampton
U21 Premier League Cup: 2014–15

Milton Keynes Dons
EFL League Two third-place promotion: 2018–19

References

External links

Profile at Southampton FC website

Living people
1996 births
Footballers from Stockport
English footballers
Southampton F.C. players
Burton Albion F.C. players
Milton Keynes Dons F.C. players
Lincoln City F.C. players
Crawley Town F.C. players
Eastleigh F.C. players
Association football midfielders
Premier League players
English Football League players
National League (English football) players